Vietnamese people in the United Kingdom include British citizens and non-citizen immigrants and expatriates of full or partial Vietnamese ancestry living in the United Kingdom. They form a part of the worldwide Vietnamese diaspora.

History and settlement
Vietnamese immigration to the United Kingdom started during WW2 but more significant numbers immigrated after the end of the Vietnam War in 1975.  The UK only accepted a few hundred of the first wave of refugees who were fleeing from the victorious North Vietnamese communists.  However, more than twenty thousand were accepted of a later wave of refugees who left Vietnam following the growing hostilities and border war between China and Vietnam. The hostilities with China resulted in many Chinese-Vietnamese being forced out from Northern Vietnam.  As a result the Vietnamese that came to the UK in that period are predominantly from Northern Vietnam and of ethnic Chinese background. 

Vietnamese refugees initially found it fairly difficult to settle into the United Kingdom, owing to the climate, lack of availability of foodstuffs traditionally employed in Vietnamese cuisine and inability to speak English. Because the Vietnamese community in the United Kingdom was then small, the new wave of immigrants found it much more complex to integrate into their host country compared to immigrants in Australia, France or the United States, where the Vietnamese communities were much larger (owing to various reasons, such as Vietnam having been a French colony, the Vietnam War, etc). 

Many Vietnamese immigrants began gravitating towards larger cities such as London, with the majority settling in the Lewisham (Vietnamese is the second most common language in the borough), Southwark, Tower Hamlets and Hackney areas. The existence of much larger and more established overseas Chinese communities in Britain has had a significant though perhaps understated effect in helping the new immigrants setting roots in their new country.

Demographics

Population

The 2001 UK Census recorded 23,347 people born in Vietnam with over 65% of these originated in Northern Vietnam. A study published in 2007 reported that community organisations estimated that there were at least 55,000 Vietnamese in England and Wales, and that 20,000 of these people were undocumented migrants and at least 5,000 were overseas students. The Office for National Statistics estimates that in 2014, 28,000 people born in Vietnam were resident in the UK.

Distribution
As with most emerging ethnic groups in the UK, the largest concentrations of Vietnamese people can be found in the larger metropolitan areas and cities, such as London (33,000), with the majority (around 1/3 of all Vietnamese Londoners) being located in Lewisham, Southwark and Hackney. Significant Vietnamese communities also exist in Birmingham (over 4,000), Leeds and Manchester (over 2,500).
According to the 2011 census, the cities with the most Vietnam-born residents are London (15,337), Birmingham (1,479), Manchester (865), Nottingham (405), Leeds (374), Northampton (322), Cambridge (259), Newcastle upon Tyne (245), Bristol (220) and Leicester (202).

Languages
Although the majority of the first Vietnamese immigrants to the UK spoke no English at all, second generation Vietnamese descendants as well as more recent immigrants have a better understanding of the English language. It is unknown how many of the 55,000 Vietnamese people in the UK speak English as a primary or secondary language; according to  Ethnologue, Vietnamese is the main language of 15,200 UK residents.

Religion
By far the most common religions for Vietnamese people in the UK are Buddhism and Roman Catholicism, which are followed by roughly 80% and 20% (respectively) of the total community's total population. This is roughtly in line with the religious breakdown of Vietnam, where 85% of the population are Buddhists and 7% are Roman Catholic.

Education and employment

Amongst the first Vietnamese refugees in the country, it was estimated that 76% received education below secondary school level. According to 2001 findings, only 18.7% of London's Vietnamese-born population had higher level qualifications, which is 15% below the London average. Despite this, in the London borough of Lewisham, Vietnamese pupils along with Chinese and Indians outperformed all other ethnic groups, with Vietnamese girls being more successful than Vietnamese boys. Because of the lack of formal education or recognised qualifications and because the vast majority of Vietnamese in London could originally not speak much English, finding employment was very difficult (around 23.5% of London's Vietnamese-born community of a working ages are unemployed). Over recent years, the nail industry has become the fastest growing business sector for Vietnamese people: it is thought that in London, over half of all Vietnamese owned businesses revolve around this industry. Catering remains a historically significant employer for the Vietnamese community as a whole. Education and employment statistics for second generation British-born people of Vietnamese origin are largely uncollated.

Social issues

Health
A PRIAE study in 2005 showed a high number of cases of osteoporosis and memory problems amongst elderly Vietnamese people in the UK. It is believed that the Vietnamese community in the UK finds it extremely difficult to gain access to the country's health services, the main reasons for this include unfamiliarity with the British health and social care sectors, Vietnamese cultural beliefs, and financial difficulties, as well as many immigrants being incapable of speaking English or being able to understand it in written form.

Housing
A study by Refugee Action showed that during the years leading up to 1993, the majority of Vietnamese British people were concentrated in overcrowded local authority housing. More recent findings state the reasons for South East Asians in the UK requesting council housing as being because they were told to leave the family home, health/medical issues and relationship breakdowns.

Human trafficking

39 Vietnamese migrants were found dead in a lorry trailer on 23 October 2019. The victims consists of mostly teenagers, who travelled in a refrigerator unit, but the refrigeration was not turned on and temperatures rose to 38.5C during the journey. This has sparked huge controversy and uproar.

Notable people
 Aoife Hinds, actress
Huong Keenleyside, novelist
Jane March, film actress and former model
Sum Ting Wong, drag performer
Jonathan Van-Tam, healthcare professional and one of two Deputy Chief Medical Officers for England

See also

 British East and Southeast Asian
 East Asian people in the United Kingdom
 Vietnamese people
 Overseas Vietnamese
 Notable Britons of Vietnamese descent
 Vietnamese people in France
 Vietnamese American

Bibliography
 Sims, Jessica Mai: The Vietnamese Community in Great Britain - Thirty Years On 
 Vietnamese living in the UK

References

External links
 Vietnamese Community in the United Kingdom  - VietHome.co.uk
 Vietnamese Chartered Accountants and Business Advisers - hienle.co.uk
 Vietnamese London
 BBC Vietnamese in Birmingham
  Vietnamese people in Birmingham

Asian diaspora in the United Kingdom

Immigration to the United Kingdom by country of origin
United Kindgom